The GPIB Paulus Jakarta, officially known as the Gereja Protestan di Indonesian Bagian Barat "Paulus", Jakarta (English: St. Paul's Protestant Church in West Indonesia, Jakarta), is a Reformed church located in Menteng, Jakarta, Indonesia.

History

The first laying of the foundation was done on 3 January 1936. The construction was complete within months and the following inauguration was held on Juni 6, 1936. The new church was named Nassaukerk.

During the Japanese occupation of the Dutch East Indies, the Church was renamed Gereja Menteng, ("Menteng Church"). During this period, the Japanese still allowed the Dutch priests to hold a mass until 1943, when the Dutch priests and the congregations were brought to internment camps. The mass itself was still held until it was banned sometimes later.

In October 1944, the Dutch language mass was replaced with Malay language, even though in reality it was still mixed with Dutch language. This condition continued until October 1945, when Indonesia proclaimed independence. After this, The church was renamed Nassaukerk again and the mass resumed in Dutch, but the desire to hold the mass in Indonesian language was apparent. At that time, there were only three Indonesian-speaking priests.

On October 31, 1948, the synod of Protestant Church in West Indonesia was formed. Nassaukerk was renamed Pauluskerk or Gereja Paulus (St. Paul's Church).

Architecture
Gereja Paulus was designed by Frans Ghijsels of AIA bureau in New Indies Style, a branch of Dutch Rationalism that appeared in the Dutch Indies. It has a cross-shaped layout, symbolizing the four cardinal points. The dominant form of the church is its steeped roofs with skylights on each of the four facades.

The church building contains a spire with four original clock faces, still functioning, topped with a steeped roof.

See also
List of church buildings in Indonesia
List of colonial buildings and structures in Jakarta

References

Churches in Jakarta
Churches completed in 1936
Colonial architecture in Jakarta
Dutch colonial architecture in Indonesia